The 2010 Philippine Golf Tour, titled as the 2010 ICTSI Philippine Golf Tour for sponsorship reasons, was the second season of the Philippine Golf Tour, the main professional golf tour in the Philippines since it was formed in 2009.

Schedule
The following table lists official events during the 2010 season.

Order of Merit
The Order of Merit was based on prize money won during the season, calculated in Philippine pesos.

Notes

References

Philippine Golf Tour
Philippine Golf Tour